Sapag may refer to:

Elías Sapag (1911–1993), Lebanese-born Argentine politician
Felipe Sapag (1917–2010), Argentine politician
Jorge Sapag (born 1951), Argentine politician
Luz Sapag (1944–2010), Argentine mayor